Terasakiella pusilla is a bacterium species from the genus of Terasakiella which has been isolated from a putrid marine shellfish.

References

Further reading

External links 
Type strain of Terasakiella pusilla at BacDive -  the Bacterial Diversity Metadatabase

Rhodospirillales
Bacteria described in 2002